The Town of Calhan is a Statutory Town located in El Paso County, Colorado, United States. The town population was 762 at the 2020 United States Census. Calhan is a part of the Colorado Springs, CO Metropolitan Statistical Area and the Front Range Urban Corridor. The town straddles U.S. Highway 24. It is the site of the Calhan Paint Mines Archeological District, a popular natural attraction.

History
Calhan was established in 1888 as a water station for the now-defunct Chicago, Rock Island and Pacific Railroad, with the first steam locomotive arriving on November 5, 1888. The town was named by and for Michael Calahan, who had the contract to lay railroad tracks from the Colorado/Kansas border to Colorado Springs. However, when the town's first U.S. Post Office opened on November 24, 1888, the middle "a" had been dropped and the town was registered as "Calhan." The town was incorporated as a Statutory Town in 1919. The town grew quickly, but it wasn't until 1906 that the Calhan Rock Island Railroad Depot was built to meet the growing needs of the area.

Jesse N. Funk was a rancher in Calhan when the United States joined the First World War in 1917. Having enlisted in 1915, Private Funk was sent to France to support the Allied efforts at the Battle of Saint-Mihiel. There on 31 October 1918, Funk rescued two wounded officers from no man's land while under machine gun fire, for which Funk received the Medal of Honor.

In 1993, the Orthodox Church in America established the Protection of the Holy Virgin community, a female monastic community. Until they moved further west to Lake George in 1995, the monastics rented a home in Calhan.

Geography

Calhan is located at  (39.035395, -104.299835).

Climate

Demographics

As of the census of 2000, there were 896 people, 347 households, and 246 families residing in the town. The racial makeup of the town was 96.99% White, 0.22% Native American, 0.67% Asian, 0.22% from other races, and 1.90% from two or more races. Hispanic or Latino of any race were 1.90% of the population.

There were 347 households, out of which 39.5% had children under the age of 18 living with them, 57.3% were married couples living together, 10.1% had a female householder with no husband present, and 29.1% were non-families. 25.4% of all households were made up of individuals, and 14.4% had someone living alone who was 65 years of age or older. The average household size was 2.58 and the average family size was 3.11.

In the town, the population was spread out, with 29.7% under the age of 18, 7.4% from 18 to 24, 28.1% from 25 to 44, 20.3% from 45 to 64, and 14.5% who were 65 years of age or older. The median age was 36 years. For every 100 females, there were 86.7 males. For every 100 females age 18 and over, there were 84.8 males.

The median income for a household in the town was $35,735, and the median income for a family was $50,000. Males had a median income of $32,135 versus $24,659 for females. The per capita income for the town was $19,266. About 3.7% of families and 8.2% of the population were below the poverty line, including 5.4% of those under age 18 and 12.0% of those age 65 or over.

Notable people
 Jesse N. Funk, Medal of Honor, World War I
 Trista Vick-Majors, Antarctic researcher

Education
Students are served by Calhan School District RJ-1.

Attractions 
Calhan Rock Island Railroad Depot
Calhan Paint Mines Archeological District
The El Paso County Fair
Calhan Summer Fest, held the Friday before the El Paso County Fair opens
The annual Homecoming Parade, held in late September/early October
Annual Christmas Parade of Lights held in December
El Paso County Speedway

Transportation
U.S. Highway 24 runs directly through town. Calhan is served by U.S. 24 as it heads to Limon from Colorado Springs.

See also

Colorado
Bibliography of Colorado
Index of Colorado-related articles
Outline of Colorado
List of counties in Colorado
List of municipalities in Colorado
List of places in Colorado
List of statistical areas in Colorado
Front Range Urban Corridor
South Central Colorado Urban Area
Colorado Springs, CO Metropolitan Statistical Area

References

External links

Town of Calhan website
CDOT map of the Town of Calhan
Calhan High School

Towns in El Paso County, Colorado
Towns in Colorado